Overview of the 2017 season of association football in the Maldives.

National teams

Maldives national football team

2019 AFC Asian Cup Qualification Third Round

Group D

Friendlies

Maldives national under-19 football team

2018 AFC U-19 Championship Qualification

Group B 
All matches are held in Kyrgyzstan.
Times listed are UTC+6.

2017 SAFF U-18 Championship

Maldives national under-17 football team

2018 AFC U-16 Championship Qualification

Group B 
All matches are held in Tajikistan.
Times listed are UTC+5.

2017 SAFF U-15 Championship

Group stage

Group B

Maldives women's national football team

2016 SAFF Women's Championship 

Group stage was played in 2016. Maldives advanced to the tournament semi-finals as Group A runners-up.

Semi-final

AFC competitions

2017 AFC Cup

Play-offs

Preliminary round 

|-
!colspan=5|South Asia Zone

|}

Play-off round 

|-
!colspan=5|South Asia Zone

|}

Group stage

Group E

League season

Premier League

Malé League

Minivan Championship

Final

Second Division Football Tournament

Final

Third Division Football Tournament

Cup competitions

FA Cup

Final

President's Cup

Final

Charity Shield

References